The Korean Studies Institute  was founded in 1995 as a non-profit foundation under the affiliation of the Ministry of Culture, Sports and Tourism. Located in Andong, it conducts  research, conservation, collection and studies on Korean archives owned by private individuals which were at risk of loss of damage over time.

References

External links 
 The Advanced Center for Korean Studies
 Confucian Culture Museum
 House of Korean Culture
 Ugyonet (Confucian culture portal website)

Universities and colleges in South Korea
1995 establishments in South Korea